During the Parade of Nations at the 2018 Asian Games opening ceremony, beginning at 19:00 WIB (UTC+7) on 18 August 2018, athletes bearing the flags of their respective nations led their national delegations as they paraded into the Gelora Bung Karno Stadium in the co-host city of Jakarta, Indonesia, preceded by their flag and placard bearer. Each flag bearer had been chosen either by the nation's National Olympic Committee or by the athletes themselves. In keeping with tradition, the host nation, Indonesia entered last. 44 teams marched in (43 nations and the Unified Korea team).

Although the Games were held in Indonesia, English was used to organize the Parade of Nations (as per Olympic Council of Asia protocol) instead of Indonesian, the official language of the nation. Had the parade followed the Indonesian alphabet, Afghanistan would have been followed by Saudi Arabia, and Jordan would have been the penultimate country before Indonesia.

Parade order
Whilst most countries entered under their short names, a few entered under more formal or alternative names, mostly due to political and naming disputes. The Republic of China (commonly known as Taiwan) entered with the compromised name and flag of "Chinese Taipei" under T so that they did not enter together with conflicting China, under C.

List

Below is a list of parading countries and their announced flag bearer, in the same order as the parade. This is sortable by country name, flag bearer's name and flag bearer's sport. Names are given in the form officially designated by the OCA.

 Iran and Saudi Arabia paraded as "IR Iran" and "Saudi Arabia" respectively, though the announcer called out the full names "Islamic Republic of Iran" and "Kingdom of Saudi Arabia".

References

Parade of Nations
Parades in Asia
Lists of Asian Games flag bearers